The 2021 ITF Men's World Tennis Tour is the 2021 edition of the second-tier tour for men's professional tennis. It is organised by the International Tennis Federation and is a tier below the ATP Challenger Tour. The ITF Men's World Tennis Tour includes tournaments with prize money ranging from $15,000 to $25,000.

Key

Month

January

February

March

References

External links
 International Tennis Federation official website

 1